PRA or Pra may refer to:

Companies and organisations 
 The People's Republic of Animation, animation company, Adelaide, Australia
 Former UK Petrol Retailers Association
 Philadelphia Redevelopment Authority, US
 Political Research Associates, US
 PRA Group, an American debt buying company
 PRA Health Sciences, a contract research organisation
 Prudential Regulation Authority, UK
 US Public Roads Administration, later Federal Highway Administration

Geography 
 Pra River (Ghana)
 Pra (Russia)
 Pra', municipality of Genoa, Italy

Military 
 Parti du Regroupement Africain (African Regroupment Party), French West Africa
 People's Redemption Army, a rebel group in Democratic Republic of the Congo and Uganda
 People's Revolutionary Army (Grenada)
 Philippine Revolutionary Army

Science and technology 
 Panel reactive antibody, an immunological laboratory test
 Pest risk analysis, conducted by regulatory plant health authorities to identify appropriate phytosanitary measures
 Phosphoribosylamine, a biochemical intermediate
 Physical Review A, a scientific journal
 Plasma renin activity in medicine
 Positive relative accommodation 
 Primitive recursive arithmetic, a formal system of arithmetic
 Probabilistic risk assessment, an engineering safety analysis
 Progesterone receptor A, one of the isoforms of the progesterone receptor
 Progressive retinal atrophy
 Purported responsible address or Sender ID of an email message
 Saccharopepsin, a yeast proteinase A

Other 
 General Urquiza Airport, Paraná, Argentina, IATA code
 Participatory rural appraisal, in international development 
 President of the Royal Academy of the United Kingdom 
 Presidential Records Act of the United States